Rony Ahonen (born 2 February 1987) is a Finnish professional ice hockey defenceman currently playing for HIFK of the Finnish Liiga. He has played with HIFK since the 2006–07 season.

Facebook

References

External links

1987 births
Finnish ice hockey defencemen
HIFK (ice hockey) players
Living people
SaiPa players
Lukko players
People from Porvoo
Sportspeople from Uusimaa
21st-century Finnish people